Obliquus capitis muscle may refer to:

 Obliquus capitis superior muscle
 Obliquus capitis inferior muscle